Uta Erickson (who often used the stage names Artemidia Grillet and Carla Erikson) was a Norwegian actress who was in many sexploitation films of the late 1960s. She starred in several provocatively titled films directed by Michael and Roberta Findlay, including The Kiss Of Her Flesh, A Thousand Pleasures, The Curse Of Her Flesh and The Ultimate Degenerate. Erickson was also a favorite of the directors Doris Wishman (Love Toy) and Barry Mahon (Sex Killer). Some of her films, notably Mnasidika, were arty enough to pass as the "low end" of an arthouse pairing with a film by a European auteur. At her best, such as in Passion in Hot Hollows  directed by Joe Sarno, her acting could make a softcore scene far more erotic. Deep Throat rang the death knell to this softcore genre and effectively ended Erickson's film career.

Ms Erickson's current whereabouts, or even if she is dead, or alive, are unknown.

Partial filmography
 Unholy Matrimony (1966) 
 Electronic Lover (1966) 
 Olga's Dance Hall Girls (1966)
 The Sex Killer (1967)
 Love Toy (1968) 
 Seeds of Sin (1968) 
 The Curse of Her Flesh (1968) 
 See How They Come (1968)
 Passion in Hot Hollows (1969) 
 She Came By Bus aka The Sick Ones (1969) 
 Mnasidika (1969) 
 She's Doing It Again (1969) 
 The Ultimate Degenerate (1969) 
 Bacchanale (1970) 
 Women Women Women Moira (1970)
 Dynamite (1972)

References

External links
 

Year of birth missing (living people)
Living people
Norwegian film actresses